Banzai! is a 1991 album by Tigertailz. It is a collection of B sides and singles originally for Japan only. It includes a remake version of "Livin' without you", and a live version of "She'z too hot" from their first album Young and Crazy, and two covers: "Creeping Death" by Metallica and "Peace Sells" by Megadeth which hint at the direction they would take for the next album.

Track listing 
 "Murderess"
 "Livin' Without You"
 "Million Dollar Smile"
 "She's Too Hot (Live)"
 "Creeping Death" (Metallica Cover)
 "Nine Livez"
 "Peace Sellz" (Megadeth Cover)
 "For a Few Dollarz More"
 "Taking the Pain"

Personnel 
Kim Hooker - vocals
Jay Pepper - guitars
Pepsi Tate - bass
Ace Finchum - drums

References

1991 albums
Tigertailz albums